Tommy Johansson (born 3 October 1958) is a Swedish sprinter. He competed in the men's 400 metres at the 1984 Summer Olympics. He also competed in the four-man bobsleigh at the 1984 Winter Olympics.

See also
 List of athletes who competed in both the Summer and Winter Olympic games

References

1958 births
Living people
Athletes (track and field) at the 1984 Summer Olympics
Bobsledders at the 1984 Winter Olympics
Swedish male sprinters
Swedish male bobsledders
Olympic athletes of Sweden
Olympic bobsledders of Sweden
Place of birth missing (living people)
20th-century Swedish people